Philippos Alexandreia F.C. is a Greek football club, based in Alexandreia, Imathia, Greece.

The club was established in 2017, after the merger of A.E. Alexandreia F.C. and Diagoras Sevasti F.C. in order to compete in 2017-18 Gamma Ethniki.

Honors

Domestic Titles and honors
as Diagoras Sevasti
 Pieria FCA Champions: 1
 2015-16

as A.E. Alexandreia
 Delta Ethniki Champions: 1
 1984-85
 Imathia FCA Champions: 4
 1979-80, 1993–94, 1999-00, 2000-01
 Imathia FCA Cup Winners: 7
 1999-00, 2000–01, 2003–04, 2005–06, 2006–07, 2008–09, 2016–17

References

Football clubs in Central Macedonia
Imathia
Association football clubs established in 2017
2017 establishments in Greece
Gamma Ethniki clubs